Martha Vickers (born Martha  MacVicar; May 28, 1925 – November 2, 1971) was an American model and actress.

Early life
Vickers was born Martha  MacVicar in Ann Arbor, Michigan; her father was an automobile dealer. She began her career as a model and cover girl. Her family moved to Hollywood when her father assumed control of an agency in Burbank, California. Vickers was 15 at that time.

Film 

Vickers' first film role was a small uncredited part in Frankenstein Meets the Wolf Man (1943).

She played minor roles in several films during the early 1940s, working first at Universal Studios and then at RKO Pictures. She next went to Warner Bros., where "they gave her the star push, rearranging her surname to 'Vickers.'" Her work there included the role of Carmen Sternwood, the promiscuous, drug-addicted younger sister of Lauren Bacall's character in The Big Sleep (1946). She also featured in a musical, The Time, the Place and the Girl (also 1946), followed by two Warner Bros. comedies, Love and Learn and That Way with Women (both 1947).

During the 1950s, however, Vickers' film career stalled.[specify]

Television 
Vickers's TV appearances included the 1959 Perry Mason episode, "The Case of the Jaded Joker", in which she played Sheila Hayes.  Her final two performances, in 1960, were on The Rebel, starring Nick Adams.

Personal life
Vickers was married three times, to A.C. Lyles (March 15, 1948 – September 28, 1948), Mickey Rooney (June 3, 1949 – September 25, 1951), and actor Manuel Rojas (September 1, 1954 – May 5, 1965). Each marriage ended in divorce. Vickers had one son with Mickey Rooney, and two daughters with Rojas.

Death 
Vickers died, aged 46, of esophageal cancer  at Valley Presbyterian Hospital in Los Angeles on November 2, 1971. She is buried in Valhalla Memorial Park Cemetery in North Hollywood, California.

Filmography

References

External links
 

 
 Martha Vickers at aenigma
 

1925 births
1971 deaths
Actresses from Michigan
American television actresses
Burials at Valhalla Memorial Park Cemetery
Deaths from cancer in California
Deaths from esophageal cancer
Actors from Ann Arbor, Michigan
20th-century American actresses